DAL Global Services, LLC, doing business as Delta Global Services (DGS), was an aviation ground handling services provider, formed late 2018, after Delta Air Lines sold a stake of its subsidiary, DAL Global Services, to Argenbright Holdings I LLC. DGS is jointly owned by Argenbright, with a 51 percent stake, and Delta, with a 49 percent stake. ERMC Aviation Services is owned by Frank A. Argenbright, founder of Argenbright Security.

In February 2020, the company rebranded as Unifi.

DGS provided services such as aircraft ground handling, aircraft maintenance, cargo handling, and many other aviation-related services. DGS served over 170 airports within the US and the Bahamas. It had contracts with multiple airlines and has not limited itself to Delta Air Lines. DGS had over 19,000 employees. It was headquartered at the Delta Air Lines headquarters in Atlanta. DGS was partnered with Delta, Alaska Airlines, Envoy Air, Sun Country, ExpressJet, Spirit and United.

See also

Delta Global Staffing

References

External links
Company web page

Aircraft ground handling companies